Böhme's gecko (Tarentola boehmei), also commonly known as the Morocco wall gecko, is a species of lizard in the family Phyllodactylidae. The species is native to western North Africa, where it is found in rocky areas such as cliffs and walls as well as ruins of buildings and urban areas.

Etymology
Both the specific name, boehmei, and the common name, Böhme's gecko, are in honor of German herpetologist Wolfgang Böhme.

Description
The pupil is a vertical slit, and the eyelids are unable to close over the eye, being replaced by a transparent membrane. The tips of the digits are enlarged, and the whole of the digits are flattened. There is a distinctive rosette of secondary tubercles around the primary tubercles on the flanks, and the nostrils are united on the snout.

Geographic range
Böhme's gecko is found in southern Morocco, northern Western Sahara, and possibly in Algeria and Mauritania. In Morocco it is present in  Tazzarine, the southern part of the Anti-Atlas Mountains, the Draa River Valley and Jebel Bani, a lower range of mountains.

Habitat
The natural habitats of T. boehmei are subtropical or tropical dry shrublands and rocky areas. It is also found in rural gardens, and urban areas.

Reproduction
T. boehmei is oviparous.

Conservation status
Böhme's gecko has a relatively restricted geographic range but is common in many places within this area. It is tolerant of disturbance to its habitat, the population trend seems steady, and no particular threats have been detected. So the International Union for Conservation of Nature has assessed its conservation status as being of "least concern".

References

Further reading
Joger U (1984). "Taxonomische Revision der Gattung Tarentola (Reptilia: Gekkonidae)". Bonner Zoologische Beiträge 35 (1-3): 129-174. (Tarentola boehmei, new species, pp. 147–149, Figure 3). (in German).
Rösler H (2000). "Kommentierte Liste der rezent, subrezent und fossil bekannten Geckotaxa (Reptilia: Gekkonomorpha)". Gekkota 2: 28–153 (Tarentola boehmei, p. 116). (in German).
Schleich HH, Kästle W, Kabisch K (1996). Amphibians and Reptiles of North Africa. Koenigstein, Germany: Koeltz Scientific Books. 630 pp. . (Tarentola boehmei, p. 268).
Sindaco R, Jeremčenko VK (2008). The Reptiles of the Western Palearctic. 1. Annotated Checklist and Distributional Atlas of the Turtles, Crocodiles, Amphisbaenians and Lizards of Europe, North Africa, Middle East and Central Asia. (Monographs of the Societas Herpetologica Italica). Latina, Italy: Edizioni Belvedere. 580 pp. .

Tarentola
Reptiles of North Africa
Reptiles described in 1984
Taxonomy articles created by Polbot
Taxa named by Ulrich Joger